In early music polyphony, superius or cantus is the Latin language-derived name given to the highest voice or part.

See also
 Voice type
 Quintus (vocal music)

References

External links
 

Vocal music